Storytelling: Live at Theater Gütersloh is a 2017 live album by English guitarist Fred Frith. It was performed by Frith in a trio with Danish saxophonist Lotte Anker and Swiss percussionist Samuel Dühsler on 18 March 2017 at the Theater Gütersloh in North Rhine-Westphalia, Germany. The recording was released on 18 August 2017 by Intuition in Germany as Volume 12 of its European Jazz Legends series.

Storytelling comprises three pieces of improvised music, plus an interview with Frith conducted by Götz Bühler. The New York City Jazz Record listed the album as one of its "Honorable Mentions New Releases" in 2017.

Reception

Reviewing the album in DownBeat, Martin Longley wrote that the trio switch freely between "complete abstraction and repeating structures" and "free-form and melody". He said that in the "Storytelling" suite there is "a gathering sense of mystery" as the music unfolds, before it becomes "rougher, more agitated", and culminates in a "hyperactive climax" at the end of "Chapter 3". Martin Laurentius wrote in Jazz Thing that on this album the trio follow their instincts. He described the "Storytelling" suite as complex avant-garde music comprising polyphonic layers with rhythmic overlays that swell and fade before building to a climax at the end.

Track listing

Sources: Liner notes, AllMusic, Discogs, Fred Frith discography.

Personnel
Fred Frith – guitar
Lotte Anker – saxophones
Samuel Dühsler – drums

Sources: Liner notes, Discogs, Fred Frith discography.

Sound and artwork
Recorded at Theater Gütersloh, Germany on 18 March 2017
Holger Siedler – recording engineer
Georg Nieshusmann – supervising engineer
Volker Dueck – producer
Lutz Voigtländer – photography
Knut Schötteldreier – cover design
Götz Bühler – liner notes

Sources: Liner notes, Discogs, Fred Frith discography.

References

2017 live albums
Fred Frith live albums
Live free improvisation albums
Interview albums